The 2011 West Virginia gubernatorial election was a special election held on October 4, 2011 to fill the office of the West Virginia Governor. The office became vacant upon the resignation of Governor Joe Manchin, who was elected to fill the seat of Robert Byrd in the United States Senate in 2010 following Byrd's death. Lieutenant Governor and Senate President Earl Ray Tomblin, first in the line of succession, became acting governor in 2010 after Manchin took up the Senate seat. On January 18, 2011, the West Virginia Supreme Court of Appeals ruled that a special election for the office of Governor must be held so a new Governor can be in place by November 15, 2011, exactly one year after Manchin resigned. The primary election was held on May 14. Tomblin and Republican Bill Maloney won their respective primaries.

Tomblin won narrowly with a plurality of the vote, defeating Bill Maloney. He notably carried over 90% of the vote in his home county of Logan County. Tomblin was declared the winner of the election by the Associated Press on October 4, 2011 and was inaugurated on November 13, 2011. With a margin of 2.5%, the special election was the closest race of the 2011 gubernatorial election cycle.

Democratic primary

Candidates

Declared
 Jeff Kessler, Acting President of the West Virginia Senate
 Arne Moltis
 John Perdue, West Virginia State Treasurer
 Natalie Tennant, West Virginia Secretary of State
 Rick Thompson, Speaker of the West Virginia House of Delegates
 Earl Ray Tomblin, Acting Governor and President of the West Virginia Senate

Declined
 Brooks McCabe, state senator
 Charlotte Pritt, former state senator, nominee for Governor in 1996 and write-in candidate for Governor in 1992

Polling

Primary results

Republican primary

Candidates

Declared
 Clark Barnes, state senator
 Mitch Carmichael, state delegate
 Ralph William Clark, professor
 Cliff Ellis
 Larry Faircloth, former State Delegate and candidate for Governor in 2004
 Betty Ireland, former West Virginia Secretary of State
 Bill Maloney, businessman
Mark Sorsaia, Putnam County District Attorney

Declined
 Shelley Moore Capito, U.S. Representative
 Patrick Lane, state delegate
 Jon McBride, retired United States naval officer; former NASA astronaut
 John Raese, businessman and nominee for the U.S. Senate in 1984, 2006, and 2010
 Mike Stuart, West Virginia Republican Party chairman

Polling

Primary results

General election

Candidates
Bob Henry Baber (Mountain), writer and former Mayor of Richwood
 Rick Bartlett (write-in)
 Harry Bertram (American Third Position Party)
 Phil Hudok (write-in), teacher and registered Constitution Party member
 Marla Dee Ingels (Independent)
 Bill Maloney (Republican), Monongalia County businessman
 Earl Ray Tomblin (Democratic), Acting Governor and President of the West Virginia Senate
 Donald Lee Underwood (write-in)

Predictions

Polling

Results

References

External links
Campaign websites (Archived)
 Earl Ray Tomblin
 Bill Maloney
 Bob Henry Baber
 Phil Hudok
 Marla Ingels
 Jeff Kessler

Information
Elections Division at the Secretary of State
2011 Gubernatorial Election

West Virginia Governor Candidates at Project Vote Smart
Campaign contributions for 2011 West Virginia Governor from Follow the Money
West Virginia Governor 2011 from OurCampaigns.com
2011 West Virginia Governor - Maloney vs. Tomblin Polling Data from Real Clear Politics

West Virginia
2011
Gubernatorial
Gubernatorial 2011
West Virginia 2011